Dark Rise is a 2021 young adult fantasy novel by Australian author C. S. Pacat. The series has been well received by critics, and is noted for its queer protagonist.

Synopsis 
The book is set in 1821 England, and focuses on Will Kemper, a queer white orphan, and Violet, the illegitimate half-Indian daughter of a lord. They work together to stop Lord Simon Crenshaw from resurrecting the Dark King that once attempted to conquer the world in the age of magic.

Reception 
The book received mixed to positive reviews from critics, with praise for reinterpreting tropes of YA fantasy. Publishers Weekly wrote that "Pacat uses fully fleshed-out, realistically flawed characters and a rich, if occasionally rote, mythology to explore issues of faith, fate, and free will."

Natalie Zutter, in a review for Tor.com, praised the setting but felt that the Stewards were too one-dimensional and pure, while the themes of temptation and darkness were underexplored compared to Pacat's previous work.

Kirkus Reviews praised the complex characterization of the novel, but felt that the head-hopping between POV characters made it difficult to connect with the story. Carrie R. Wheadon of Common Sense Media wrote that, despite good worldbuilding, the characters were largely unlikeable with the exception of Violet.

The book received the 2021 Aurealis Award for Best Fantasy Novel.

References 

LGBT speculative fiction novels
Young adult fantasy novels
2021 fantasy novels
Quill Tree Books books
LGBT-related young adult novels
2020s LGBT novels